Christopher Cook (born 1968) is a retired American soccer player who played professionally in the American Professional Soccer League.  He was the 1991-92 USISL indoor season MVP.

Cook spent most of his youth in Dallas, but moved to Nashville, Tennessee his junior year of high school.  In 1986, he graduated from Franklin High School.  Cook attended Belmont Abbey College where he was a 1988 Second Team and 1989 First Team NAIA All American soccer player.  He graduated with a bachelor's degree in sports management.

In 1990, Cook turned professional with the New Mexico Chiles of the American Professional Soccer League.  He then moved to Atlanta, joining the Atlanta Magic of the USISL.  Cook was the 1991–92 USISL indoor season MVP  He played for the Magic through at least the 1994 outdoor season.

References

Living people
American soccer players
American Professional Soccer League players
Place of birth missing (living people)
1968 births
Atlanta Magic players
New Mexico Chiles (APSL) players
USISL players
Association football midfielders
Association football forwards